Two people were executed under heresy laws during the reign of James I (1406–1437). Protestants were then executed during persecutions against Protestant religious reformers for their religious denomination during the reigns of James V (1513–1542) and Mary, Queen of Scots (1542–1567). The excesses of this period were recorded in Foxe's Book of Martyrs.

See also
Patrick Hamilton (martyr)
George Wishart
Forty Martyrs of England and Wales
List of Catholic martyrs of the English Reformation
Saint John Ogilvie
John Black (martyr)
George Douglas (martyr)
William Gibson (martyr)
Patrick Primrose
Hugh Barclay of Ladyland, David Graham, Laird of Fintry,  Spanish blanks plot
Alexander Cameron (priest)

Sources

References

Lists of Christian martyrs
Scottish Reformation
16th-century Protestant martyrs
James V of Scotland
Mary, Queen of Scots
Religiously motivated violence in Scotland
Human rights abuses in Scotland
Political and cultural purges